Senator McKnight may refer to:

Edwin T. McKnight (1869–1935), Massachusetts State Senate
Joe McKnight (politician) (born 1933), Tennessee State Senate
Robert W. McKnight (born 1944), Florida State Senate